Přeštěnice is a municipality and village in Písek District in the South Bohemian Region of the Czech Republic. It has about 300 inhabitants.

Administrative parts
Villages and hamlets of Držkrajov, Mlčkov and Týnice are administrative parts of Přeštěnice.

References

Villages in Písek District